

NAVCA (the National Association for Voluntary and Community Action) is the national membership body for local support and development organisations in England. It is a registered charity (1001635), based in Sheffield, and was previously called the National Association of Councils for Voluntary Service (NACVS).

History 
The Councils for Voluntary Service National Association was a project of NCVO. In 1991, this project became independent and was named the National Association of Councils for Voluntary Service (NACVS). In June 2006, NACVS was renamed the National Association for Voluntary and Community Action (NAVCA). Previous chief executives have been Neil Cleeveley, Joe Irvin, Kevin Curley and Jane Ide. Its current CEO is Maddy Desforges.

Purpose 
NAVCA's stated purpose is to promote the local voluntary and community sector nationally. It provides members with information, advice, networking and learning opportunities, support and development services and in turn it draws on its members' experience to influence government and contribute to national policy. Local support and development organisations are often known as Voluntary Action, Community Action or Council for Voluntary Service. These organisations support local charities, voluntary organisations and community groups by providing them with support, information and funding advice.

Campaigns
NAVCA advocates social value, whereby public authorities have regard to economic, social and environmental well-being when commissioning goods and services. NAVCA supported Chris White MP's private members bill that incorporated social value in legislation through the Public Services (Social Value) Act 2012.

Membership 
NAVCA has a membership network of nearly 200 local sector support and development organisations in England. NAVCA members work with around 200,000 small local charities and voluntary organisations to provide advice, support and services.

References

External links
NAVCA official web site

Charities based in Sheffield
1991 establishments in the United Kingdom
Organizations established in 1991
Volunteering in the United Kingdom